Falsacalolepta granulipennis is a species of beetle in the family Cerambycidae, and the only species in the genus Falsacalolepta. It was described by Breuning in 1970.

References

Lamiini
Beetles described in 1970